Jorge Barón Televisión is a Colombian programadora on Canal Uno and Caracol TV, most popularly known for its shows El Show de las Estrellas, Telepaís and 20/20. It was founded by Jorge Barón on May 24, 1969.
In 1989, it acquired the rights to show that year's Copa Libertadores. In that same year i record the program Embajadores de la música colombiana where they performed a concert called Colombia Te Quiero that developed in the Madison Square Garden in New York City attended by 30,000 Colombians. Since the arrival of private channels in Colombian television in 1998, it has decreased its output. As of 2020, El Show de las Estrellas currently airs on Canal RCN.

External links 
  Official website

Television production companies of Colombia
Mass media companies established in 1969